Paul Dujardin may refer to:
 Paul Dujardin (water polo)
 Paul Dujardin (art historian)
 Paul Dujardin (engraver)